Herpetogramma phaeopteralis,  dark sod webworm, is a moth in the family Crambidae. It was described by Achille Guenée in 1854.

Distribution
It is found in the United States (from South Carolina to Florida, west to Texas), Central America and South America, on the Andamans, India, Myanmar, Sri Lanka, Vietnam, the Democratic Republic of the Congo, Kenya, Réunion, Madagascar, Mauritius, Saint Helena, the Seychelles, Sierra Leone, South Africa, Sudan, the Gambia, Yemen and Zambia.

Larvae and adults
The larvae feed on the leaves of grasses. Full-grown larvae reach a length of 25 mm. They have a greyish-green or yellowish-green body and a brown head.

The adult's wingspan is about 18 mm. The forewings are medium to dark greyish brown with blackish antemedial and postmedial lines and two dark spots in the median area. The hindwings are similar but slightly paler.

References

Moths described in 1854
Herpetogramma
Moths of North America
Moths of South America
Moths of Asia
Moths of Africa